Werner Heyer (born 14 November 1956) is a German racewalker. He competed in the men's 20 kilometres walk at the 1980 Summer Olympics.

References

1956 births
Living people
Athletes (track and field) at the 1980 Summer Olympics
German male racewalkers
Olympic athletes of East Germany
Place of birth missing (living people)